The 1991–92 Fordham Rams men's basketball team represented Fordham University as a member of the Patriot League during the 1991–92 NCAA Division I men's basketball season. The team was coached by Nick Macarchuk, in his fifth year at the school, and played their home games at Rose Hill Gymnasium. The Rams had a record of 18–13 (11–3 Patriot League), finishing atop the conference regular season standings. They followed that success by winning the Patriot League tournament to receive an automatic bid to the NCAA tournament as No. 14 seed in the East region. Fordham lost in the opening round to UMass, 85–58.

Roster

Schedule

|-
!colspan=9 style=| Regular season

|-
!colspan=9 style=| Patriot League tournament

|-
!colspan=9 style=| NCAA tournament

References 

Fordham Rams men's basketball seasons
Fordham
Fordham
Fordham
Fordham